Draper Fisher Jurvetson is a venture capital firm.

DFJ may also refer to:

Democratic Federal Yugoslavia, a former country
DFJ Frontier, American venture capital firm

See also
D. F. Jones